Léo Lasko (1885–1949) was a German screenwriter and film director of the silent and early sound eras. As Lasko was of Jewish descent he was classified as a "non-Aryan" by the Nazis. Following their 1933 takeover he was banned from film work and eventually emigrated to Britain.

Selected filmography
Director
 The Merry Husband (1919)
 The Dagger of Malaya (1919)
 The Panther Bride (1919)
 The Howling Wolf (1919)
 The Woman Without a Soul (1920)
 Va banque (1920)
 Indian Revenge (1920)
The Pink Jersey (Das rosa Trikot) (1920)
 The Convict of Cayenne (1921)
 James Morres (1921)
 The Devil's Chains (1921)
 The Buried Self (1921)
 Parisian Women (1921)
 People of the Sea (1925)
 Hands Up, Eddy Polo (1928)
 Scapa Flow (1930)
 Night of Temptation (1932)

Screenwriter
 Vendetta (1919)
 Wibbel the Tailor (1920)
 The Land of Smiles (1930)
 Schubert's Dream of Spring (1931)
 Night of Temptation (1932)

Bibliography

External links

1885 births
1949 deaths
Film people from Hamburg
Jewish emigrants from Nazi Germany to the United Kingdom
Silent film screenwriters
20th-century screenwriters